Harish Komme, is an Indian film editing professional, known for his works in Kannada cinema. He works predominantly on Kannada films. His Karnataka State Film Award for Best Editor was for his work on the feature film Mufti (2017) directed by Narthan.

Career
He made his Debut as a Film Editor in 2015, with the Kannada movie "Eradondla Mooru". He subsequently worked in the movie Mufti starring Dr.Shiva Rajkumar & Srii Murali, produced under the banner Jayanna Combines. The movie earned him Karnataka State Film Award for Best Editor for the year 2017.

He also worked as Promo Editor for a couple of films, one of which is a well-known film called Santheyalli Nintha Kabira released in the year 2016 starring Dr.Shiva Rajkumar.

He spearheaded the editing of critically acclaimed film Ammachi Yemba Nenapu which is based on Dr.Vaidehi's Short Stories directed by Champa P Shetty. Some of his recently released are Inspector Vikram (2021 film), Madhagaja and Premam Poojyam.

Awards
Karnataka State Film Awards
 2017: Best Editing - Mufti

Filmography 

{| class="wikitable sortable" style="text-align:center;"
|-
! rowspan="2" style="width:35px;"| Year
! rowspan="2" style="width:200px;"| Title
! colspan="3" style="width:100px;"| Credited as
! rowspan="2" style="width:350px;" class="unsortable"| Notes
|-
! style="width:50px;" | Editor
! style="width:50px;" | Producer
|-
| 2015 || style="text-align: left;"|Eradondla Mooru ||  ||  ||
|-
| 2017 || style="text-align: left;"|Mufti ||  ||  ||
|-
| 2018 || style="text-align: left;"|Ammachi Yemba Nenapu ||  ||  ||
|-
| 2021 || style="text-align: left;"|Inspector Vikram ||  ||  ||
|-
| 2021 || style="text-align: left;"|Premam Poojyam ||  ||  ||
|-
| 2021 || style="text-align: left;"|Madhagaja ||  ||  ||
|-
| 2022 || style="text-align: left;”|Inspector Vikram ||  ||  || Malayalam film
|-
| 2022 || style="text-align: left;”|Hope ||  ||  ||
|-
| 2022 || style="text-align: left;"|Monsoon Raaga' ||  ||  ||
|-
| 2022 || style="text-align: left;”|Head Bush ||  ||  || Editing Supervision
|-
| 2022 || style="text-align: left;”|Mysore Diaries ||  ||  ||
|-
| 2022 || style="text-align: left;”| Once upon a time in Jamaligudda ||  ||  ||
|-
| 2023 || style="text-align: left;”|Once upon a time in Devarakonda ||  ||  || Telugu film
|-
| 2023 || style="text-align: left;"|Koli Esru (Completed) ||  ||  ||  || One of the Producer 
|-
| 2023 || style="text-align: left;"|Gana ||  ||  || Post Production
|-
| 2023 || style="text-align: left;"|Daredevil Musthafa ||  ||  || Post Production
|-
| 2023 || style="text-align: left;”|Love Li ||  ||  || Filming
|-
| 2023 || style="text-align: left;”|Pahije Jatiche ||  ||  || Marati film
|-
|}

See also
 Karnataka State Film Award for Best Editor''

References

External links
 
 https://www.deccanherald.com/state/state-film-award-2017-699865.html
 https://www.ibtimes.co.in/karnataka-state-film-awards-2017-shuddhi-declared-best-movie-raajakumara-wins-best-entertainer-784000
 https://vijaykarnataka.com/news/karnataka/karnataka-film-awards-announced/amp_articleshow/66367331.cms
 https://www.thenewsminute.com/article/ktaka-film-awards-shuddhi-bags-best-film-tara-and-vishruth-naik-best-actors-90585
 https://newstrailindia.com/inner.php?id=6776
 https://www.thenewsminute.com/article/ammachi-yemba-nenapu-review-beautiful-kannada-film-celebrates-women-90909

Living people
Kannada film editors
editors
1985 births